Mauro Vargiu (born 25 February 1983 in Cagliari) is a retired Italian professional football player.

1983 births
Living people
Italian footballers
Italian expatriate footballers
Expatriate footballers in Scotland
Italian expatriate sportspeople in Scotland
Scottish Premier League players
Dundee F.C. players
U.S. Pistoiese 1921 players
Vis Pesaro dal 1898 players
Association football defenders